The 1894 California gubernatorial election was held on November 6, 1894, to elect the governor of California. This was the last election until 1938 in which a Democrat was elected Governor of California.

Results

References

1894
California
gubernatorial
November 1894 events